Alapta was a town of Chalcidice, ancient Macedonia. It is mentioned in the Periplus of Pseudo-Scylax as one of the cities that were inhabited by Greeks located beyond the peninsula of Pallene. It is cited between the cities of Acanthus and Arethusa.

Its site is unlocated.

References

Populated places in ancient Macedonia
Former populated places in Greece
Geography of ancient Chalcidice
Lost ancient cities and towns